Foozia was a genus of vascular Emsian (Lower Devonian) land plant with a main axis and a number of branches that sub-divide at most once.  Some of these bear oval to semicircular sporangia containing Dibolisporites echinaceus, whereas the sterile branches may represent an early foray into leaf-formation.  The only known fossils herald from Belgium.
It is currently unclassified.

References 

Early Devonian plants
Prehistoric plant genera